Ni Hong (born 1986-02-28 in Beijing) is a female Chinese sabre fencer, who competed at the 2008 Summer Olympics.

Major performances
2008 World Cup Grand Prix Tianjin – 1st team

See also
China at the 2008 Summer Olympics

References

1986 births
Living people
Chinese female sabre fencers
Fencers at the 2008 Summer Olympics
Olympic fencers of China
Olympic silver medalists for China
Fencers from Beijing
Olympic medalists in fencing
Medalists at the 2008 Summer Olympics
Universiade medalists in fencing
Universiade bronze medalists for China
Medalists at the 2009 Summer Universiade